The following are the telephone codes in Somalia.

Calling formats
To call in Somalia, the following format is used:
 yxx xxxx, yy xxx xxx or yyy xxx xxx - Calls within Somalia
 +252 yxx xxxx, +252 yy xxx xxx or +252 yyy xxx xxx  - Calls from outside Somalia

List of area codes in Somalia

The telecommunication industry in Somalia is managed by private businesses since the collapse of the Siad Barre government in 1991.

Mobile operators 

According to the National Communications Authority, there are 16 registered mobile network operators in the country. A number of these operators have assigned numbering ranges.

References

Somalia
Telecommunications in Somalia
Telephone numbers